Georgis Grigorakis (born 20 May 1983) is a Greek film director and screenwriter. He has received awards at the 70th Berlin Film Festival and the Hellenic Film Academy Awards 2021 for his debut film Digger.

Career 

Georgis was born and raised in Athens. He studied psychology in the UK and did a master's degree in film direction (fiction) at the National Film and Television School in Beaconsfield, UK.

He first started making short films in 2007 and his debut feature film, Digger was premiered at the 70th Berlin Film Festival Panorama programme, winning the CICAE Art Cinema Award.

Filmography

Film

Short film

Videos

Awards and nominations

Grigorakis' films have been nominated more than 50 times and won more than 30 awards.

His debut feature film Digger won 19 awards, including 10 awards at the Hellenic Film Academy Awards 2021.

References

External links
 Official Website
 Georgis Grigorakis on the Internet Movie Database
  Interview with Georgis Grigorakis on Lifo magazine
  Interview with Georgis Grigorakis on CineEuropa
  Interview on Variety magazine
  Interview on Mubi

1983 births
Living people
20th-century Greek male writers
21st-century Greek male writers
Greek film directors
Greek screenwriters
Male screenwriters
Film people from Athens
Alumni of the National Film and Television School